Vojislav Simeunović (Serbian Cyrillic: Војислав Симеуновић; born 8 August 1942) is a Serbian football coach and former player.

His son Marko is a former Slovenian national team goalkeeper.

References

External links

1942 births
Living people
Sportspeople from Šabac
Association football defenders
Yugoslav footballers
Serbian footballers
Yugoslav Second League players
Yugoslav First League players
FK Partizan players
NK Maribor players
Serbian football managers
Slovenian football managers
NK Maribor managers